The 2001–02 Danish Cup was the 48th version of the Danish Cup. The final was played on May 9, 2002.

The winner qualified for UEFA Cup qualification.

Results
The team listed to the left, is the home team.

1st round
In first round competed 48 teams from the "series" (Denmark's series and lower 2000) and 16 teams from Danish 2nd Division 2000-01.

2nd round
In second round competed 32 winning teams from 1st round and 8 teams from Danish 1st Division 2000-01 (no. 9 to 16).

3rd round
In third round competed 20 winning teams from 2nd round, 6 teams from Danish 1st Division 2000-01 (no. 3 to 8) and 2 teams from Danish Superliga 2000-01 (no. 11 and 12).

4th round
In fourth round competed 14 winning teams from 3rd round, 2 teams from Danish 1st Division 2000-01 (no. 1 and 2) and 4 teams from Danish Superliga 2000-01 (no. 7 to 10).

5th round
In fifth round competed 10 winning teams from 4th round and 6 teams from Danish Superliga 2000-01 (no. 1 to 6).

Quarter finals

Semi finals
The semi finals are played on home and away basis.

Final
The final was played at Parken Stadium.

See also
 Football in Denmark
 Danish Superliga 2001-02
 Danish 1st Division 2001-02

External links
Danish Cup 2001-02 Results from DBU

Danish Cup
Cup
2002